Zurab Vladimirovich Sanaya (born 15 April 1968) is a Russian professional football coach and a former player.

As a player, he made his debut in the Soviet Second League in 1985 for FC Nart Cherkessk.

His son Anzor Sanaya is a professional footballer.

References

Russian people of Abkhazian descent
1968 births
Sportspeople from Stavropol
Living people
Soviet footballers
Russian footballers
Russian expatriate footballers
Expatriate footballers in Greece
FC Dynamo Stavropol players
Russian Premier League players
FC Baltika Kaliningrad players
FC Fakel Voronezh players
Russian football managers
FC Baltika Kaliningrad managers
Paniliakos F.C. players
FC Metallurg Lipetsk players
FC Zhemchuzhina Sochi managers
Russian expatriate football managers
Expatriate football managers in Kazakhstan
Association football goalkeepers
FC Sokol Saratov players
FC Mashuk-KMV Pyatigorsk players